Repatriated is a Mexican drama streaming television series, which is produced by BTF Media for the Walt Disney Company. In Latin America, the ten-part first season of the series was released on September 21, 2022 on Star+.

Plot  
Leonel grows up in the United States believing that Roberto is his birth father. Although he is not sure of his origins and does not speak Spanish, he constantly has nightmares about the Mexico – United States border and a woman Leonel cannot remember. Leonel does not question anything, however, because he has been leading a happy life so far. In addition to the good relationship with his parents, he not only has a wonderful girlfriend and close friends, but also a more than promising future as a boxer. What he does not know is that this is about to be radically changed by a betrayal. One day, faced with an important battle, Leonel is classified as an illegal immigrant and as a result arrested and deported to Matamoros, Mexico, without the opportunity to prove his US citizenship. Fate now leads Leonel to a picturesque neighborhood in Mexico City, where he faces many new challenges. Leonel not only has to learn a new language, get used to the Mexican culture and break down prejudices, but also ensure his survival, get to know his roots, implement his ideas and uncover old secrets. At the same time, Leonel tries to make new friends and possibly the true love, without his big dream of being a professional boxer and his urge to return to the country where he had previously seen his home and where his old life was waiting for him to lose sight.

Cast 
 Ricardo Abarca as	Leonel Reina
 Paco Rueda as El Gordo
 Dagoberto Gama as	Don Chucho
 Valeria Burgos as	Miss Meche
 Coco Máxima as Yadi
 Armando Hernández as Trejo
 Sonya Smith as April
 Esteban Caicedo as Kevin
 Erick Cañete as Iker
 Ian Sebastián as Martín
 Chappell Bunch as	Grace
 Raquel Robles as Mary, la hondureña
 Estrella Solís as	Guadalupe Contreras

References

External links 
 

2020s drama television series
Television shows filmed in Mexico
2020s Mexican television series
Spanish-language television shows
Star+ original programming